Hipólito González Calvo (born 10 November 1976 in Barcelona) is a  blind B2 goalball athlete from Spain. He played goalball at the 1996 Summer Paralympics. His team came in third place.  He played goalball at the 2000 Summer Paralympics. His team came third yet again.

References

External links 
 
 

1976 births
Living people
Paralympic goalball players of Spain
Paralympic bronze medalists for Spain
Paralympic medalists in goalball
Goalball players at the 1996 Summer Paralympics
Goalball players at the 2000 Summer Paralympics
Medalists at the 1996 Summer Paralympics
Medalists at the 2000 Summer Paralympics
People from Barcelona